Guinee Airlines was an airline based in Guinea. It was founded in 1999 and ceased operations again in 2004.

Code data
Guinee Airlines operated its flight under
IATA Code: J9
ICAO Code: GIF
Callsign: GUINEE AIRLINES

Fleet
Guinee Airlines operated the following aircraft types:
Boeing 737-100
Boeing 737-200

External links
 Airline History

Companies of Guinea
Defunct airlines of Guinea
Airlines established in 1999
Airlines disestablished in 2004
1999 establishments in Guinea